The Tale of Two Lovers ( 1444) is a novel by Aeneas Sylvius Piccolomini, the future Pope Pius II. It is one of the earliest examples of an epistolary novel, full of erotic imagery. The first printed edition was published by Ulrich Zell in Cologne between 1467 and 1470.

The novel is set in Siena, Italy, and centres on the love story of Lucretia, a married woman, and Euryalus, one of the men waiting on the Duke of Austria. After an uncertain beginning, in which each is in love but unaware that it is reciprocated, they begin a correspondence, which takes up much of the rest of the novel. Before writing his first love-letter, Euryalus quotes Virgil in defence of his position,  (translated: "Love conquers all; let us all yield to love!").

The lovers were identified by some with Kaspar Schlick, the chancellor of Sigismund, Holy Roman Emperor and a daughter of the elder Mariano Sozzini, Aeneas' law teacher at the University of Siena.

In 1462, it was translated into German by Niklas van Wyle who dedicated it to his patron Mechthild of the Palatinate.

Translations have been made into several languages, including English.

Notes

References

External links
 The Tale of Two Lovers, available at Corpus Scriptorum Latinorum
 Historia de duobus amantibus. Bibliotheca Augustana text.

15th-century novels
Italian novels
Erotic novels
Epistolary novels
1444 works
Siena
Novels set in Tuscany
15th-century Latin books